The Star Pavilion is a music and entertainment venue in Hersheypark Stadium located in Hershey, Pennsylvania, United States.

History
Opened in 1996, the pavilion is mostly used for summer concerts and can seat up to 8,000 people, with reserved seats. It is located behind the north end zone of the Stadium.

External links
The Star Pavilion at Hersheypark Stadium

Hersheypark
Hershey Entertainment and Resorts Company
1996 establishments in Pennsylvania
Music venues completed in 1996